Jansing and Company is a weekday morning news and information program that aired on MSNBC from 2010 to 2014. The show aired weekdays at 10 am ET. Chris Jansing hosted the program with Richard Lui serving as in-studio correspondent.

The show debuted on Monday October 4, 2010 and served as the beginning of MSNBC's dayside news coverage.

The show ended on June 13, 2014, when Jansing became NBC's Senior White House Correspondent.

References

External links
 Official webpage
 Jansing & Company on Internet Movie Database
 Jansing & Company on TV.com

2010s American television news shows
2010 American television series debuts
2014 American television series endings
English-language television shows